Nova Xavantina Esporte Clube, commonly known as Nova Xavantina, is a Brazilian football club based in Nova Xavantina, Mato Grosso state.

History
The club was founded on March 20, 1986. They won the Campeonato Mato-Grossense Second Level in 2010, but was not promoted to the 2011 Campeonato Mato-Grossense First Level due to financial problems and because their stadium failed in the safety inspections.

Achievements
 Campeonato Mato-Grossense Second Level:
 Winners (1): 2010

Stadium
Nova Xavantina Esporte Clube play their home games at Estádio Virgílio Nascimento. The stadium has a maximum capacity of 2,000 people.

References

Association football clubs established in 1986
Football clubs in Mato Grosso
1986 establishments in Brazil